is a 2014 Japanese film directed by Takashi Koizumi.

Cast
Kōji Yakusho as Shūkoku Toda
Junichi Okada as Shōzaburō Dan'no
Maki Horikita as Kaoru Toda
Mieko Harada as Orie Toda
Shinobu Terajima
Hisashi Igawa
Kenichi Yajima

Plot

A retired samurai must redeem himself for a crime that he committed earlier in his life. A squire is sent by the prime minister of Japan to keep watch over him.

Development

Teruyo Nogami, who was a longtime assistant of Akira Kurosawa, worked as a special adviser on the film, and joined the director and star for a question and answer session about the film.

The film was based on an award-winning novel by Rin Hamuro.

Koizumi claimed that he did not want to send any political messages with the film and instead intended to portray the real life events as accurately as possible.

Reception

The film debuted at number two in the Japanese box office and grossed a total of $8,804,424 in Japan.

The Japan Times awarded the film a score of five out of ten, saying that the film failed to invoke the film of Akira Kurosawa that it was influenced by. [Though Koizumi and his veteran staff try to channel that sensibility, they are not Kurosawa, and though “A Samurai Chronicle” echoes the master’s work, it lacks his vivifying presence.

References

External lists
http://www.thefilmcatalogue.com/catalog/FilmDetail.php?id=17808 
 

2014 films
Samurai films
2010s Japanese films
2010s Japanese-language films
Films about miscarriage of justice